Dara Mohammed Habib (born June 25, 1987 in Kirkuk, Iraq) is an Iraqi football player of Kurdish ethnicity, who played at the 2009 FIFA Confederations Cup.

Info 
Dara Mohammed, who turns 22 on 19 June, raised quite a few eyebrows when he earned a place in Iraq's FIFA Confederations Cup squad in preference to many of the country's seasoned full-backs. Yet despite his youth, few question that he has the potential to develop into one of the nation's most dependable defenders. 
Born in 1987 in Kirkuk in the north-east of Iraq, the Kurdish player has spent his relatively short career with two regional clubs. After spending a couple of seasons with Sulaymaniyah FC, where he announced his emergence as a promising star, he quickly earned a lucrative contract with Iraqi giants Erbil FC in 2007.

His stint with Erbil FC proved short, but it was impressive nonetheless as he won his first national league title in his first and only season with the club. The next season saw him come full circle, returning to Sulaymaniyah FC, with whom he has remained until this day.

Having thrived at left-back position on the domestic scene, Mohammed was charged with the task of shoring up Iraq's defence during the qualifying campaign for the Men's Olympic Football Tournament at Beijing 2008. His reward for some solid showings at that level was a call-up to the Iraqi senior team for 2010 FIFA World Cup South Africa qualifier against Pakistan, and now a place at the Festival of Champions in South Africa.

Personal life
On 17 March 2018, it was reported that Dara is suffering from cancer.

References

External links

1986 births
Iraqi footballers
Iraq international footballers
Living people
Al-Quwa Al-Jawiya players
2009 FIFA Confederations Cup players
Kurdish sportspeople
Iraqi Kurdish people
Association football fullbacks